Charles Rider Hobson, Baron Hobson (18 February 1904 – 17 February 1966) was a British Labour politician and life peer.

Political career
Hobson was Member of Parliament for Wembley North from 1945 to 1950 and for Keighley from 1950 to 1959. He was Assistant Postmaster-General in 1947.

On 20 January 1964, he was created a life peer as Baron Hobson, of Brent in the County of Middlesex. He served as a Lord-in-waiting (whip) in the House of Lords from 1964 to his death.

Personal life
In 1933, Hobson married Doris Mary Spink. Together they had one daughter, Marian Hobson: Marian would go on to be a scholar of French.

References

External links 
 

1904 births
1966 deaths
Amalgamated Engineering Union-sponsored MPs
Labour Party (UK) Baronesses- and Lords-in-Waiting
Labour Party (UK) MPs for English constituencies
Labour Party (UK) life peers
Ministers in the Attlee governments, 1945–1951
Place of birth missing
Place of death missing
UK MPs 1945–1950
UK MPs 1950–1951
UK MPs 1951–1955
UK MPs 1955–1959
UK MPs who were granted peerages
Ministers in the Wilson governments, 1964–1970
Life peers created by Elizabeth II